Parviz Boroumand Sharif (born 11 September 1972, in Tehran) is an  Iranian football goalkeeper who currently is head coach of Dore 98 F.C. in Iran 2nd division League.

Club career 
Broumand previously played for IPL sides Esteghlal and Rah Ahan.

Broumand was also formerly an Iranian national team player who was reserve goalkeeper in the 1998 FIFA World Cup squad.

His most memorable performance was for Esteghlal FC against Persepolis FC in 2001 when he struck a Persepolis player Payan Rafat in the face starting one of the largest fights in the history of the rivalry. After this game Broumand and several players from both sides were handed suspensions, his being the largest at 18 months was eventually shortened.

In 2007, he announced his retirement from football after finishing 2006–2007 season with Rah Ahan in Iran Pro League, but in 2012 he returned to professional football after six years absent in age of 38. He joined his former Esteghlal teammate Mehdi Pashazadeh who was a head-coach for Parseh Tehran.

Club Career statistics

References

Profile at teammelli.com

External links
Video of Boroumand–Rafat Conflict in Tehran Derby

1972 births
Living people
Iranian footballers
Association football goalkeepers
Esteghlal F.C. players
Sepahan S.C. footballers
Rah Ahan players
fajr Sepasi players
Sportspeople from Tehran
1998 FIFA World Cup players
2000 AFC Asian Cup players
Iran international footballers